Joanie or Joannie is a feminine given name which may refer to:

People:
 Joan Joanie Bartels (born 1953), American children's music singer and songwriter
 Joanie Keller, American country music singer
 Joanie Mackowski (born 1963), American poet
 Joanie Madden, Irish-American flute and whistle player of Irish traditional music
 Joanne Joanie Mahoney (born 1965), American politician, first woman County Executive of Onondaga County, New York
 Joannie Rochette (born 1986), Canadian figure skater
 Joanie Sommers, American singer and actress born Joan Drost in 1941
 Joanie or Joan Weston (1935–1997), American roller derby skater

Fictional characters:
 Joanie Caucus, in the comic strip Doonesbury
 Joanie Cunningham, on the American TV series Happy Days
 Joanie Taylor, on the British TV series The Catherine Tate Show
 Joanie Wright, on the British soap opera Emmerdale

See also
 Joan (given name)
 Joni (disambiguation)

Feminine given names